Li Yang (born 20 August 1985 in Beijing) is a male Chinese sports shooter.

He competed in the trap event for Team China at the 2008 Summer Olympics. Finishing sixteenth in the qualification, he did not reach the final. He belongs to the Beijing Shooting School.

References
 http://2008teamchina.olympic.cn/index.php/personview/personsen/2817

1985 births
Living people
Chinese male sport shooters
Olympic shooters of China
Sport shooters from Beijing
Shooters at the 2008 Summer Olympics
Trap and double trap shooters
Universiade medalists in shooting
Universiade silver medalists for China
Medalists at the 2011 Summer Universiade
21st-century Chinese people